Dicyema is a genus of worms belonging to the family Dicyemidae.

Species:

 Dicyema acciaccatum McConnaughey, 1949
 Dicyema acheroni McConnaughey, 1949
 Dicyema acuticephalum Nouvel, 1947 - parasitizes Octopus vulgaris 
 Dicyema aegira McConnaughey & Kritzler, 1952
 Dicyema akashiense Furuya, 2005
 Dicyema apalachiensis Short, 1962
 Dicyema apollyoni Nouvel, 1947
 Dicyema australis Penchaszadeh, 1969
 Dicyema awajiense Furuya, 2005
 Dicyema balanocephalum Furuya, 2006
 Dicyema banyulensis Furuya & Hochberg, 1999
 Dicyema benedeni Furuya & Hochberg, 1999
 Dicyema benthoctopi Hochberg & Short, 1970
 Dicyema bilobum Couch & Short, 1964
 Dicyema briarei Short, 1961
 Dicyema caudatum Bogolepova-Dobrokhotova, 1960
 Dicyema clavatum Furuya & Koshida, 1992 - parasitizes Octopus minor 
 Dicyema colurum Furuya, 1999 - parasitizes Octopus fangsiao 
 Dicyema dolichocephalum Furuya, 1999 - parasitizes Octopus minor 
 Dicyema erythrum Furuya, 1999 - parasitizes Octopus fangsiao 
 Dicyema ganapatii Kalavati, Narasimhamurti & Suseela, 1984
 Dicyema hadrum Furuya, 1999 - parasitizes Sepia esculenta 
 Dicyema helocephalum Furuya, 2005
 Dicyema hypercephalum Short, 1962
 Dicyema irinoense Furuya, 2005
 Dicyema japonicum Furuya & Tsuneki, 1992 - parasitizes Octopus vulgaris 
 Dicyema knoxi Short, 1971
 Dicyema koshidai Furuya & Tsuneki, 2005
 Dicyema leiocephalum Furuya, 2006
 Dicyema lycidoeceum Furuya, 1999 - parasitizes Sepia lycidas 
 Dicyema macrocephalum (van Beneden, 1876)
 Dicyema madrasensis Kalavati, Narasimhamurti & Suseela, 1984
 Dicyema maorum Short, 1971
 Dicyema megalocephalum Nouvel, 1934
 Dicyema microcephalum Whitman, 1883
 Dicyema misakiense Nouvel & Nakao, 1938 - parasitizes Octopus vulgaris 
 Dicyema monodi Nouvel, 1934
 Dicyema moschatum Whitman, 1883
 Dicyema nouveli Kalavati, Narasimhamurti & Suseela, 1984
 Dicyema octopusi Kalavati, Narasimhamurti & Suseela, 1984
 Dicyema oligomerum Bogolepova-Dobrokhotova, 1960
 Dicyema orientale Nouvel & Nakao, 1938 - parasitizes Sepioteuthis lessoniana 
 Dicyema oxycephalum Furuya, 2009
 Dicyema paradoxum von Kölliker, 1849
 Dicyema platycephalum Penchaszadeh, 1968
 Dicyema rhadinum Furuya, 1999 - parasitizes Sepia esculenta 
 Dicyema robsonellae Short, 1971
 Dicyema rondeletiolae Nouvel, 1944
 Dicyema schulzianum (van Beneden, 1876)
 Dicyema sepiellae Furuya, 2008
 Dicyema shimantoense Furuya, 2008 -    parasitizes Octopus sasakii
 Dicyema shorti Furuya, Damian & Hochberg, 2002
 Dicyema sphaerocephalum Furuya, 2005
 Dicyema sphyrocephalum Furuya, 1999 - parasitizes Octopus minor 
 Dicyema sullivani McConnaughey, 1949
 Dicyema tosaense Furuya, 2005
 Dicyema typoides Short, 1964
 Dicyema typus van Beneden, 1876
 Dicyema whitmani Furuya & Hochberg, 1999

References

Dicyemida